

Events

March events 
 March 19 – Boston and Maine Railroad Extension, which was incorporated a dispute with the Boston and Lowell Railroad over trackage rights rates in Massachusetts, is merged into Boston and Maine Railroad.

July events
 July – James Hooper succeeds Eleazer Lord as president of the Erie Railroad.
 July 1 – Boston and Maine Railroad opens the extension over the former Boston and Maine Railroad Extension line between Wilmington and Boston.
 July 21 – An unprecedented number of railway acts receive Royal Assent from Queen Victoria in the United Kingdom as the railway mania approaches its peak, Parliament having sanctioned  of new construction.

August events
 August – Benjamin Loder succeeds James Hooper as president of the Erie Railroad.

October events
 October 8 – The Montour Iron Works of Danville rolled the first iron T-rails in Pennsylvania.
 October 22 – First section of the Württemberg Central Railway opens, between Cannstatt und Untertürkheim.

Unknown date events
 William Swinburne, shop foreman for Rogers, Ketchum and Grosvenor, leaves Rogers to form his own locomotive manufacturing company, Swinburne, Smith and Company.
 Walter McQueen becomes chief mechanical engineer for the Hudson River Railroad.

Births

June births 
 June 24 – Georges Nagelmackers, Belgian founder of the Compagnie Internationale des Wagons-Lits, the company known for the Orient Express trains (d. 1905).

September births 
 September 17 – Calvin S. Brice, president of Lake Erie and Western Railroad, builder of Nickel Plate Road (d. 1898).

November births 
 November 18 – Edwin Winter, president of Northern Pacific Railway in 1868 and Brooklyn Rapid Transit beginning in 1902 (d. 1930).

Deaths

January deaths
 January 14 – William F. Harnden, founder of Harnden and Company express, first person to send an express shipment by rail (b. 1812).

References
 Erie Railroad presidents. Retrieved March 15, 2005.
 Rivanna Chapter, National Railway Historical Society (2005), This Month in Railroad History: March. Retrieved March 30, 2005.